Douglas Eugene Pike (July 27, 1924 – May 13, 2002) was a leading American historian and foremost scholar on the Vietnam War and the Viet Cong based at Texas Tech University from 1997, was director of the Indochina Archive at the University of California, Berkeley from 1981 and prior to that served as Foreign Service Officer in Asia, with assignments in Saigon (now Ho Chi Minh City), Hong Kong, Tokyo and Taipei. Pike served for 15 years as the State Department's leading analyst.  He was considered the leading expert on the National Liberation Front and NVA (People's Army of Vietnam) before his death in 2002.

Pike received a degree in journalism from the University of North Dakota, a bachelor's in international communications from the University of California, Berkeley, an MA from American University in Washington D.C. (1958), and did a year of graduate work at the MIT Center for International Studies (1963–64).

He was the founder of the journal Indochina Chronology which was subscribed to by academics and diplomats worldwide. He has authored numerous books and articles on the war and the National Liberation Front. His book PAVN: People's Army of Vietnam has been described as "one of the two or three most significant books to emerge from the war".

Early life
Pike was born in Cass Lake, Minnesota. He grew up in Minor and had planned on a career in journalism, but with the outbreak of World War II, he joined the Army Signal Corps and served in the South Pacific. He served between 1943–1946 and reached the rank of Master Sergeant.

The Indochina Chronology
Pike founded The Indochina Chronology in 1982 to cover both historical and contemporary events in Vietnam, Cambodia, and Laos.

Published works
 Douglas Pike, Viet Cong. The organization and techniques of the National Liberation Front of South Vietnam (Massachusetts Institute of Technology 1966)
 Douglas Pike, War, Peace, and the Viet Cong (Massachusetts Institute of Technology 1969)
 Douglas Pike, History of Vietnamese Communism, 1925-1976 (Hoover Institution Press 1978)
 Douglas Pike, PAVN: People's Army of Vietnam (Presidio Press 1986)

References

External links
 The Indochina Chronology
 Complete text of Douglas Pike's "Vietcong Strategy of Terror" (PDF)

20th-century American historians
20th-century American male writers
1924 births
2002 deaths
People from Cass Lake, Minnesota
American male non-fiction writers
United States Army personnel of World War II
CIA personnel of the Vietnam War